Infopark, Kochi is an information technology park situated in the city of Kochi, Kerala, India.

The notable tenants in the park include Indian technology giants like Tata Consultancy Services, Wipro, HCL Technologies, Tech Mahindra, LTIMindtree, UST Global, BYJU'S, IBS Software etc. and foreign corporations like IBM, Cognizant, KPMG, Ernst & Young, IQVIA, Xerox, Conduent, Invesco, EXL Service, Hubbell, Alight, Nielsen, Quest Global, Buck etc.

The Infopark campus currently has  of built-up area and is the major contributor of IT export revenue from the state of Kerala. A huge real estate boom was triggered soon after Infopark started to attract big MNCs from around the globe. Infopark changed the landscape and lifestyle of Kochi, particularly the Kakkanad area. A new culture got evolved and more and more commercial and residential ventures started to rise up which then extended the limits of Kochi city to further north end.

The park is built on the 'Hub and Spoke model' for the development of the Information Technology industry in Kerala. InfoPark Kochi acts as the hub to the spokes located at Thrissur and Cherthala.

Location and connectivity

Infopark is connected to Seaport-Airport Road via the Infopark Expressway, a 4-lane road. Kerala State Water Transport Department operates boat service between Kakkanad and Vyttila Mobility Hub. The Ernakulam district administration, which comprise the city of Kochi has proposed a waterway connecting InfoPark to Marine Drive, Kochi.

The Infopark campus lies adjacent to SmartCity, Kochi, an information technology park, making the town of Kakkanad a very important center for IT/ITES in the state of Kerala.

VSNL's communication gateway, is located close to Infopark. Two submarine cables, SAFE and SEA-ME-WE 3, have their landing points at the gateway. Infopark is directly linked by optical fiber to the gigabyte router of VSNL, which provides the park with 100% uptime data connectivity. Other major bandwidth providers such as BSNL, Reliance, Bharti Airtel and Power Grid Corporation are also present in the park.

Revenue and growth 
Over the last few years revenues from Infopark has been growing at an impressive rate. In FY 2008-2009 the park reported a growth of 87% to Rs. 463 crore. Infopark registered export revenues of Rs. 750 crore in 2010-11, Rs. 1,095 crore in 2011-12, Rs. 1,534 crore in 2012-13. IT exports from Infopark continue to register strong growth in the 2013-14 financial year, with revenues surging 53 per cent year-on-year to Rs 2,350 crore.
The IT park which is just ten years old has shown tremendous growth in the number of companies and software exports than any other park in the state. Kochi offers good opportunities for companies keen on reducing operational costs, hiring talented professionals, and reducing the rate of attrition. Since its inception in 2004, Infopark has created over three million sq. ft. of work space and intends to double this to six million sq. ft. over the next couple of years. The park also expects to generate over 10,000 additional jobs during the financial year 2015-16.
The work for the second phase of Infopark is progressing well and a number of global IT firms have come up with proposals to set up their campus at the Rs 2,500 crore project, which is expected to be completed by 2020.

Apart from the built-up space for IT, Infopark plans to have a large business convention centre, budget hotels, shopping complexes, commercial centers, recreation and entertainment facilities. Infrastructure development is ongoing.

Educational Institutions
Kochi InfoPark hosts one of the prominent educational and research institutes. The Indian Institute of Management Kozhikode (IIM–K) has set up it first satellite campus at Athulya building in InfoPark. Jain University in Kochi opened in 2019. The satellite campus, initially, offers one-year residential executive MBA programme as well as two-year part-time programmes in addition to several short and long-term management development programmes. The Government of Kerala has offered five acres of land for the full-fledged campus inside InfoPark.

Infrastructure 

Infopark campus is divided into Special Economic Zone (SEZ) and non – SEZ facility. Of the existing 98.25 acres of Infopark, 75 acres has been notified as a Special Economic Zone by the Ministry of Commerce, Government of India. The infrastructure developed in the park has been classified as Muilti tenanted facility (MTF)and Built to suit (BTS).

Apart from Infopark owned infrastructure (Thapasya, Vismaya, Athulya), parallel developments by co-developers such as Leela Soft, L&T Techpark and Brigade Enterprises are also taking shape in the campus. Thus offering IT companies a choice of office space solutions to fit their requirement and budget. Major Private IT campus by Wipro, TCS and IBS Software are also in progress. When Infopark Kochi Phase-I is fully developed a total super built-up area of 5 million sqft would be completed. The campus includes amenities such as food courts, banking counters, ATM, shopping arcade, etc.

In 2014, Leela Infopark, a non – SEZ facility owned by Leela Lace Holding Pvt Ltd was acquired by Mumbai-based Carnival Group for INR 280 Crores and the name of the project was changed to Carnival Infopark Lulu Group has acquired the L&T Tech Park for INR 150 Crores and the name of the project was changed to Lulu Tech Park.

Smart Business Centre (SBC) is provided to facilitate Indian and foreign IT/ITES and knowledge based companies to commence operations immediately from a plug and play facility at Infopark.

Infopark Phase II 

Considering the requests of various IT companies and developers for space and land, Infopark Kochi is expanding its activities in Infopark Phase II. The Jyothirmaya building inaugurated by the Chief Minister of Kerala on Jan 22 2017  is at a distance of around 1.6 km from Phase I campus and is on the side of Kadamprayar river. The new park is envisaged to be a landmark in the IT history of Kerala with both SEZ and non-SEZ type of development and social infrastructure. The new park lies in an extent of 160 acres in the neighboring Kunnathunad- Puthencruz villages of Kunnathunad Taluk, Ernakulam District. The Board of Approvals (BoA) of the Union Ministry of Commerce have granted SEZ status to the 98 acres in Infopark phase II.

A master plan for the second phase envisages infrastructure development for cost-effective Software development blocks in SEZ and non-SEZ clusters, BPO complexes, utility services including substation, water treatment plant, sewage treatment plant, road network, etc. The park will be designed as an eco-friendly green park with high energy-saving measures and least carbon emission. The existing ecosystem will be maintained to the highest possible level. Apart from the built-up space for IT, the park will have a large business convention center the first of its kind in Kochi, budget hotels, shopping complexes, commercial centers, recreation, and entertainment centers.

Infopark along with its co-developers expect to create 8 million sq.ft. of IT/ITES/BPO and associated basic infrastructure and commercial and social infrastructure space. The basic infrastructure that will be developed by Infopark will include a 220 kV Gas Insulated Substation (GIS) with distribution facilities, access, and internal roads, stormwater drains, cable trenches, water treatment, and supply, data connectivity, etc. Master Plan of the Park has been developed by CannonDesign, New York-based Architectural Consultant.

Three multinational companies have already evinced interest in the Rs 2,500 crore, 8 Million sqft Phase II of Infopark Kochi. The second phase, which will create 80,000 software jobs, is expected to be completed in eight years. Infrastructure development will be undertaken in a phased manner and will be completed by 2011. The construction of the first IT building of around 5 lakhs sq.ft. has commenced and is expected to be completed by December 2012. On full completion, total employment expected to be generated in this new campus is 80,000.

Cognizant Technology Solutions has a 1.6 Million Sq.Ft self owned campus in 15 acres in Infopark phase II.
UST Global is also all set to start a new campus at Infopark Phase II.

Branches
Infopark has branched out to nearby cities and towns. The park is built on the 'Hub and Spoke model' for the development of the Information Technology industry in Kerala. InfoPark, Kochi acts as the hub to the spokes located at Thrissur and Cherthala

Infopark Thrissur

Infopark Thrissur is located at Koratty which is around 45 km from Kochi in Thrissur District. It is approximately 20 km from Cochin International Airport at Nedumbassery. The park is situated very close to the National Highway 47. Currently, Infopark, Thrissur possesses 30 acres of prime land. It is expected that some more land also will be added to the Park in the near future. Infrastructure development work for the Park has already commenced. The first set of IT Buildings of approximately 40,000 sft area with plug and play facilities is ready and companies have started setting-up operations at Thrissur. Phase-II additional 3,30 lakhs sft of space will be ready for allotment by October 2015. Close proximity to the airport and national highway with uninterrupted Power, Water and Connectivity has already generated keen interest among IT Entrepreneurs to commence operations from Infopark, Thrissur.

Infopark Cherthala 

Located in Pallipuram village, Cherthala taluk of Alappuzha District. The total area of the park is 66 acres of which 60 acres has been notified as a sector-specific Special Economic Zone by the Ministry of Commerce, Government of India vide notification dated 8 June 2009. The First IT Building by Infopark having an area of 2.4 lakhs sq.ft is now ready for operations. Ready to move in Plug n Play options for Start-ups and Small Medium Companies and Warm shell options for Companies who are looking for a big scale space. The IT Building is well equipped to suit the IT Companies with Food courts, Conference Hall, Discussion Rooms, Game Zones, etc.

Transportation

There are a large number of private buses which operate into the InfoPark campus from different corners of Kochi city such as Aluva, downtown Ernakulam and Thripunithura. KURTC operates AC low-floor bus services to and from InfoPark.

A boat service runs between Vyttila Mobility Hub and Kakkanad jetty, which is located close to the InfoPark Expressway. This ferry covers the distance between Vyttila and Kakkanad in 20 minutes.

The Kochi Metro rail has planned its extension to Kakkanad from Kaloor Stadium. This extension will terminate at InfoPark with a metro station each at Phase-I and Phase-II campuses, thus giving efficient metro rail connectivity to the IT park.

The lack of transport connectivity to Infopark at Kakkanad is a big hurdle for the 30,000 workforces. At a workshop on ‘Connecting the Dots on Public Transport’, recently organized by CPPR and WTC, Kochi has come up with a slew of proposals to develop public transport in the area. These, include re-routing of buses or providing additional bus services to the area, introducing modern transportation infrastructure such as demand-based bus systems and improving existing water and road connectivity to the area.

See also
 Cyberpark
 Economy of Kochi
 Infopark, Thrissur
 Smart City, Kochi
 Cyber City, Kochi
 Electronics City, Kochi
 Technopark, Trivandrum
 Infopark Cherthala

References

External links

 

Economy of Kochi
2004 establishments in Kerala
Software technology parks in Kerala
Government-owned companies of Kerala